is a Japanese anime television series based on the Lensman novels by E. E. "Doc" Smith. The 25-episode series aired from October 6, 1984 to August 8, 1985 in Japan.

Harmony Gold USA created an English dubbed compilation of episodes 1-3 and 5-6 in a heavily edited form, which they released under the title Lensman: Power of the Lens. The other episodes were never dubbed into English. This compilation is no longer available on video, although it was available in the UK on a prerecorded PAL-VHS cassette in the late 1980s. A Catalan dubbed version of the series was broadcast in Spain by TV3 in 1994.

Despite sharing character and organization names, as well as central themes common to the books, artistic license produced a final product altogether different from the source material. Although it was produced with the knowledge and consent of Smith's estate, the executors were so displeased with the result that for several years they rejected any other suggestions of adaptation.

Production 
 Vintage: October 6, 1984 to August 8, 1985
 Original Creator: E. E. Smith
 English Version: Harmony Gold USA, Inc. (1987)
 Executive producer: Soji Yoshikawa
 Director: Hiroshi Fukutomi
 Key Animation: Shinya Ohira, Yasuomi Umetsu
 Theme Song Performance:
 Opening Theme: "On The Wing" by Eri Kojima
 Ending Theme: "Paradise (パラダイス)" by Yudai Suzuki

Characters 
  Admiral Haynes: Voiced by Hidekatsu Shibata (Japanese) Ray Michaels (English)
 Kimball Kinnison: Voiced by Toshio Furukawa (Japanese) Ryan O'Flannigan (English)
 LaVerne Thorndyke: Voiced by Kaneto Shiozawa (Japanese) Dave Mallow (English)
 Sol: Voiced by Tomiko Suzuki (Japanese) Leonard Pike (English)
 Peter VanBuskirk: Voiced by Banjo Ginga (Japanese) Jeremy Plat (English) 
 Worsel of Velantia: Voiced by Keiichi Noda (Japanese) Drew Thomas (English) 
 Clarissa MacDougall: Voiced by Mami Koyama (Japanese) Aline Leslie (English)
 Henry Henerson: Voiced by Hideyuki Hori (Japanese)
 Fritz von Hohendorff: Voiced by Masaharu Sato (Japanese)
 Tregonsee: Voiced by Naoki Tatsuta (Japanese)
 Lord Helmuth: Voiced by Seizo Katou (Japanese)
 Romulon: Voiced by Eiji Kanie (Japanese)
 Flick: Voiced by Hiroko Emori (Japanese)
 Zelda: Voiced by Hiromi Tsuru (Japanese)
 Morou: Voiced by Hiroshi Ohtake (Japanese)
 Neizel: Voiced by Kouji Totani (Japanese)
 Rana: Voiced by Mari Keiko (Japanese)
 Thomas: Voiced by Michitaka Kobayashi (Japanese)
 Diane: Voiced by Mika Ishizawa (Japanese)

References

External links
 

1984 anime television series debuts
1985 Japanese television series endings
Animated space adventure television series
Asahi Broadcasting Corporation original programming
Lensman series
Tatsunoko Production
Madhouse (company)
Science fiction anime and manga
TV Asahi original programming

zh:銀河戰士